Aventine Secession may refer to:

Aventine Secession (494 BC)
Aventine Secession (20th century)